Fresh Pretty Cure! is the sixth Pretty Cure anime television series produced by Toei Animation. The series focuses on four Cures, Love Momozono, Miki Aono, Inori Yamabuki and Setsuna Higashi, who transform into Cure Peach, Cure Berry, Cure Pine, and Cure Passion, respectively. Their mission is to defend this world and the parallel worlds from the evil Labyrinth. The series began airing in Japan from February 1, 2009 and January 31, 2010, replacing Yes! Precure 5 GoGo! in its initial timeslot and was succeeded by HeartCatch PreCure!. It has four pieces of theme music: two opening and two ending themes. The opening theme for episodes the first 25 episodes is "Let's! Fresh Pretty Cure" (Let's!フレッシュプリキュア Rettsu! Furesshu Purikyua?) by Mizuki Moie, and the ending theme is "You make me happy!" by Momoko Hayashi. For episodes 26–50 the opening theme is "Let's! Fresh Pretty Cure! ~Hybrid Version~" (Let's!フレッシュプリキュア~Hybrid.ver~ Rettsu! Furesshu Purikyua ~Hybrid.ver~?) by Mizuki Moie and Momoko Hayashi, and the ending theme is "H@ppy Together" by Momoko Hayashi.


Episode list

See also
Fresh Pretty Cure! the Movie: The Toy Kingdom has Lots of Secrets!? - An animated film based on the series.
Pretty Cure All Stars DX: Everyone's Friends☆the Collection of Miracles! - The first film in the Pretty Cure All Stars crossover series, which stars the Fresh Pretty Cure.

References

2009 Japanese television seasons
2010 Japanese television seasons
Pretty Cure episode lists

es:Anexo:Episodios de Futari wa Pretty Cure